Theridion elegantissimum is a species of spider in the family Theridiidae. It is found in Taiwan.

References

Theridiidae
Spiders described in 1942
Spiders of Taiwan